Xu Shaohua (born January 1958) is a retired Chinese politician. Previously he was executive vice governor of Guangdong province and vice chairman of Guangdong People's Congress.

Early life and education
Xu was born in Guangzhou, Guangdong in January 1958. Xu entered Sun Yat-sen University in September 1979, majoring in economics, where he graduated in July 1983.

Career
Xu entered the workforce in December 1974 and joined the Communist Party of China in March 1984.

In April 1989, Xu served as the deputy magistrate of Fengkai County, he was elevated to the magistrate position in December 1992. In October 1994, Xu was promoted to become the CPC Fengkai County Committee Secretary.

In March 1996, Xu was elevated to the vice mayor of Zhaoqing.

In January 1998, Xu was transferred to Zhanjiang and appointed the vice-mayor of Zhanjiang. In 2000, Xu was promoted to become mayor of Zhanjiang. In August 2005, Xu served as party chief of Zhanjiang.

In April 2008, he was promoted to become the deputy secretary general of Guangdong, a position he held until February 2012, when he was appointed the executive vice-governor of Guangdong. In January 2017, he was appointed vice chairman of Guangdong People's Congress, serving in the post until his retirement in January 2021.

References

1958 births
Chinese Communist Party politicians from Guangdong
Sun Yat-sen University alumni
Living people
People's Republic of China politicians from Guangdong
Politicians from Guangzhou
Mayors of Zhanjiang
Political office-holders in Guangdong